Sovietization is the adoption of a political system based on the model of soviets (workers' councils) or the adoption of a way of life, mentality, and culture modelled after the Soviet Union. This often included adopting the Latin or Cyrillic script, and sometimes also the Russian language.

Itself, the term Soviet as a form of self-organization that arose during the 1905 Russian Revolution was positive in nature being associated with equality, justice, democracy. However, during the revolutionary period of late 1917 and the Bolshevik coup-d'état, the soviets went through transformation known in history as bolshevization of the Soviets during which Bolsheviks or "the Reds" became the leading force in this movement of self-organization. Bolshevization of the Soviets led to situation of "Dual power" in the post-Tsarist Russia where "the Reds was fighting the Contra". Since then, the term has been associated exclusively with communism and the Bolsheviks' state of Soviet Union.

A notable wave of Sovietization (in the second meaning) occurred in Mongolia and later during and after World War II in Central Europe (Czechoslovakia, East Germany, Hungary, Poland etc.). In a broad sense, this included (voluntary and involuntary) adoption of Soviet-like institutions, laws, customs, traditions, and the Soviet way of life, both on a national level and in smaller communities. This was usually promoted and sped up by propaganda aimed at creating a common way of life in all states within the Soviet sphere of influence. In many cases, Sovietization was also accompanied by forced resettlement of large categories of "class enemies" (kulaks, or osadniks, for instance) to the Gulag labor camps and exile settlements.

In a narrow sense, the term Sovietization is often applied to mental and social changes within the population of the Soviet Union and its satellites which led to creation of the new Soviet man (according to its supporters) or Homo Sovieticus (according to its critics).

See also
Democracy in Marxism
Sovietization of the Baltic states
Soviet patriotism
Russification
Korenizatsiya
National delimitation in the Soviet Union

References

Further reading
 
 Weeks, Theodore R. (2010), Russification / Sovietization, EGO - European History Online, Mainz: Institute of European History, retrieved: March 25, 2021 (pdf).

Soviet internal politics
Soviet phraseology
Social history of Belarus
Soviet Union
Imperialism
Politics of the Soviet Union
Neo-Sovietism
Nationalism in the Soviet Union
History of Czechoslovakia
History of East Germany
Hungarian People's Republic
Polish People's Republic
Poland–Soviet Union relations
Social history of Ukraine
Cultural assimilation